Triops australiensis, sometimes referred to as a shield shrimp, is an Australian species of the tadpole shrimp Triops.

Distribution
Triops australiensis has a wide distribution across Australia, excluding the northernmost parts of Western Australia,  and Queensland. It is also absent from Tasmania in the south, where it is replaced by Lepidurus apus. The two species can be distinguished by the presence of a supra-anal plate between the caudal rami at the end of the abdomen in L. apus, which is lacking in T. australiensis.

Biology
T. australiensis inhabits temporary pools of water in the arid regions of the Australian outback. When desiccated pools fill with water, the resting eggs hatch into nauplii, and rapidly develop to adulthood. Reproduction succeeds within a few weeks of hatching.

Water chemistry
Triops australiensis can tolerate a pH of 7–9, and can live in both hard and soft water, but the eggs of T. australiensis are more likely to hatch in water with a low mineral content.

References

External links

Notostraca
Freshwater crustaceans of Australia
Endemic fauna of Australia
Crustaceans described in 1895
Taxa named by Walter Baldwin Spencer